Ulu-Yelan (Oloyalan) is a rural locality (a village) in Lemezinsky Selsoviet, Iglinsky District, Bashkortostan, Russia. The population was 18 as of 2010. There is 1 street.

Geography 
Ulu-Yelan is located 67 km east of Iglino (the district's administrative centre) by road. Nizhniye Lemezy is the nearest rural locality.

References 

Rural localities in Iglinsky District